The 20th Cuban National Series was 51 games long, and Vegueros, from Pinar del Río Province, won its second title, outdistancing Villa Clara and Citricultores.

Standings

References

 (Note - text is printed in a white font on a white background, depending on browser used.)

Cuban National Series seasons
Base
Base
1981 in baseball